In abstract algebra, a semiring is an algebraic structure similar to a ring, but without the requirement that each element must have an additive inverse.

The term rig is also used occasionally—this originated as a joke, suggesting that rigs are rings without negative elements, similar to using rng to mean a ring without a multiplicative identity.

Tropical semirings are an active area of research, linking algebraic varieties with piecewise linear structures.

Definition 

A semiring is a set  equipped with two binary operations  and  called addition and multiplication, such that:

  is a commutative monoid with identity element :
 
 
 
  is a monoid with identity element :
 
 
 Multiplication left and right distributes over addition:
 
 
 Multiplication by  annihilates :
 

Compared to a ring, a semiring omits the requirement for inverses under addition; that is, it requires only a commutative monoid, not a commutative group. In a ring, the additive inverse requirement implies the existence of a multiplicative zero, so here it must be specified explicitly. If a semiring's multiplication is commutative, then it is called a commutative semiring.

There are some authors who prefer to leave out the requirement that a semiring have a 0 or 1. These authors often use  for the concept defined here.

Theory 

One can generalize the theory of (associative) algebras over commutative rings directly to a theory of algebras over commutative semirings.

Idempotent semirings are specific to semiring theory since any idempotent semiring that is also a ring is in fact trivial. One can define a partial order  on an idempotent semiring by setting  whenever  (or, equivalently, if there exists an  such that ).

Applications 

The  and  tropical semirings on the reals are often used in performance evaluation on discrete event systems. The real numbers then are the "costs" or "arrival time"; the "max" operation corresponds to having to wait for all prerequisites of an events (thus taking the maximal time) while the "min" operation corresponds to being able to choose the best, less costly choice; and + corresponds to accumulation along the same path.

The Floyd–Warshall algorithm for shortest paths can thus be reformulated as a computation over a  algebra.  Similarly, the Viterbi algorithm for finding the most probable state sequence corresponding to an observation sequence in a hidden Markov model can also be formulated as a computation over a  algebra on probabilities.  These dynamic programming algorithms rely on the distributive property of their associated semirings to compute quantities over a large (possibly exponential) number of terms more efficiently than enumerating each of them.

Examples 

By definition, any ring is also a semiring. A motivating example of a semiring is the set of natural numbers  (including the number zero) under ordinary addition and multiplication. Likewise, the non-negative rational numbers and the non-negative real numbers form semirings. All these semirings are commutative.

In general 

 The set of all ideals of a given ring form an idempotent semiring under addition and multiplication of ideals.
 Any unital quantale is an idempotent semiring under join and multiplication.
 Any bounded, distributive lattice is a commutative, idempotent semiring under join and meet.
 In particular, a Boolean algebra is such a semiring. A Boolean ring is also a semiring (indeed, a ring) but it is not idempotent under .  A  is a semiring isomorphic to a subsemiring of a Boolean algebra.
 A normal skew lattice in a ring  is an idempotent semiring for the operations multiplication and nabla, where the latter operation is defined by 
 Any c-semiring is also a semiring, where addition is idempotent and defined over arbitrary sets.
 Isomorphism classes of objects in any distributive category, under coproduct and product operations, form a semiring known as a Burnside rig. A Burnside rig is a ring if and only if the category is trivial.

Semiring of sets 

A  (of sets) is a (non-empty) collection  of subsets of  such that
 If (3) holds, then  if and only if 
If  then 
If  then there exists a finite number of mutually disjoint sets  such that 

Conditions (2) and (3) together with  imply that  Such semirings are used in measure theory. An example of a semiring of sets is the collection of half-open, half-closed real intervals 

 If  then there exists a finite number of mutually disjoint sets  such that 

This condition is stronger than (3), which can be seen as follows. Then:

and every  since it is closed under intersection, and disjoint since they are contained in the disjoint 's. Moreover the condition is strictly stronger: any  that is both a ring and a semialgebra is an algebra, hence any ring that is not an algebra is also not a semialgebra (e.g. the collection of finite sets on an infinite set ).

Specific examples

Variations

Complete and continuous semirings 

A complete semiring is a semiring for which the additive monoid is a complete monoid, meaning that it has an infinitary sum operation  for any index set  and that the following (infinitary) distributive laws must hold:

Examples of a complete semiring are the power set of a monoid under union and the matrix semiring over a complete semiring.

A continuous semiring is similarly defined as one for which the addition monoid is a continuous monoid. That is, partially ordered with the least upper bound property, and for which addition and multiplication respect order and suprema.  The semiring  with usual addition, multiplication and order extended is a continuous semiring.

Any continuous semiring is complete: this may be taken as part of the definition.

Star semirings 

A star semiring (sometimes spelled starsemiring) is a semiring with an additional unary operator , satisfying

A Kleene algebra is a star semiring with idempotent addition and some additional axioms. They are important in the theory of formal languages and regular expressions.

Complete star semirings 

In a complete star semiring, the star operator behaves more like the usual Kleene star: for a complete semiring we use the infinitary sum operator to give the usual definition of the Kleene star:

where  

Note that star semirings are not related to *-algebra, where the star operation should instead be thought of as complex conjugation.

Conway semiring 

A Conway semiring is a star semiring satisfying the sum-star and product-star equations:

Every complete star semiring is also a Conway semiring, but the converse does not hold. An example of Conway semiring that is not complete is the set of extended non-negative rational numbers  with the usual addition and multiplication (this is a modification of the example with extended non-negative reals given in this section by eliminating irrational numbers).

An iteration semiring is a Conway semiring satisfying the Conway group axioms,  associated by John Conway to groups in star-semirings.

Examples 

Examples of star semirings include:
 the semiring of formal languages is also a complete star semiring, with the star operation coinciding with the Kleene star (for sets/languages).
 The Boolean semiring with 

Dioid 

The term dioid (for "double monoid") has been used to mean various types of semirings:
 It was used by Kuntzman in 1972 to denote what is now termed semiring.
 The use to mean idempotent subgroup was introduced by Baccelli et al. in 1992.
 The name "dioid" is also sometimes used to denote naturally ordered semirings.

Generalizations 

A generalization of semirings does not require the existence of a multiplicative identity, so that multiplication is a semigroup rather than a monoid.

Yet a further generalization are : in addition to not requiring a neutral element for product, or right-distributivity (or left-distributivity), they do not require addition to be commutative. Just as cardinal numbers form a (class) semiring, so do ordinal numbers form a near-semiring, when the standard ordinal addition and multiplication are taken into account. However, the class of ordinals can be turned into a semiring by considering the so-called natural (or Hessenberg) operations instead.

That the cardinal numbers form a rig can be categorified to say that the category of sets (or more generally, any topos) is a 2-rig.

See also

Notes

Citations

Bibliography 

 
 François Baccelli, Guy Cohen, Geert Jan Olsder, Jean-Pierre Quadrat, Synchronization and Linearity (online version), Wiley, 1992, 
 Golan, Jonathan S., Semirings and their applications. Updated and expanded version of The theory of semirings, with applications to mathematics and theoretical computer science (Longman Sci. Tech., Harlow, 1992, . Kluwer Academic Publishers, Dordrecht, 1999. xii+381 pp.

Further reading 

 
 
 
 
 
 Steven Dolan (2013) Fun with Semirings, 

Algebraic structures
Ring theory